The Lithuanian Confederation of Industrialists or LPK is a major association of industry associations and companies in Lithuania which represents the interests of large industrialists and employers. The Confederation in an umbrella organization uniting 52 trade and 5 regional associations and 24 non-associated members which comprise over 2700 medium and large enterprises from various public and private sectors. Confederation membership is entirely voluntary. LPK members cover all the main sectors of industry, generating 83% of Lithuanian exports and 46% of total Lithuanian GDP.

LPK is a full-fledged member of international organizations like Confederation of European Business (BUSINESSEUROPE), International Organisation of Employers (IOE), Business at OECD (BIAC) and others.

History 
LPK considers itself a successor of the Union of the Lithuanian Entrepreneurs, Industrialists and Businessmen, established in June 1930. The Union ceased to exist in 1940 when Lithuania was occupied by the Soviet Union and all businesses were nationalized. The modern Association of Lithuanian Industrialists was established on June 17, 1989 (it was later renamed to the Confederation of Lithuanian Industrialists). The Association united manufacturing companies, banks, trade and commercial enterprises as well as educational and research institutions.

Established awards 
 Successfully Working Company
 Lithuanian Exporter of the Year
 Lithuanian Product of the Year
 Knight of Profession
 Achievements in Environment Protection
 Innovation Prize
 Petras Vileišis Nomination
 Vytautas Andrius Graičiūnas Nomination
 Golden Sign of Honour

Presidents 
 Rimvydas Jasinavičius (1989–1990)
 Algimantas Matulevičius (1990–1993)
 Bronislovas Lubys (1993–2011)
 Robertas Dargis (2012–2020)
Vidmantas Janulevičius (since 2020)

References 

1989 establishments in Lithuania
Organizations based in Vilnius
Employers' organizations
Trade associations based in Lithuania